Tschernitz is a municipality in the district of Spree-Neiße, in Brandenburg, Germany. It lies on the border with Saxony.

Demography

References

Populated places in Spree-Neiße